Swedbank Arena may refer to:
 Friends Arena, Stockholm, home arena for the Sweden men's national football team and AIK Fotboll, known as Swedbank Arena between 2009 and 2012.
 Hägglunds Arena, Örnsköldsvik, home arena for Modo Hockey, known as Swedbank Arena between 2006 and 2009.
 Solid Park Arena, Västerås, home arena for Västerås SK Fotboll, known as Swedbank Park between 2008 and 2015.
 Stadion, Malmö, home arena for Malmö FF, known as Swedbank Stadion between 2007 and 2017.